Donald James Reece (born 13 April 1934 in Kingston, Jamaica) is an Emeritus Archbishop of the Roman Catholic Archdiocese of Kingston in Jamaica.

Biography

Donald James Reece received on 3 January 1971 his priestly ordination and Pope John Paul II appointed him on 17 July 1981 bishop to the Roman Catholic Diocese of Saint John's–Basseterre. His consecration was given by Samuel Emmanuel Carter, SJ, Archbishop of Kingston, Kelvin Edward Felix, Archbishop of the Roman Catholic Archdiocese of Castries and Joseph Oliver Bowers, SVD, former bishop of the  Diocese of Saint John's-Basseterre on 8 October of the same year.

On 12 October 2007 he was appointed by Pope Benedict XVI Coadjutor Archbishop of Kingston in Jamaica. After the retirement of Lawrence Aloysius Burke, SJ, he followed him on 12 April 2008 by the Office of the Archbishop of Kingston in Jamaica.

On 15 April 2011 Benedict XVI accepted his resignation as Archbishop of Kingston.

In 2012, he was honored for his contributions to education and religion with the Order of Jamaica, the fourth highest medal of Jamaica.

References

External links

 http://www.catholic-hierarchy.org/bishop/breece.html

20th-century Roman Catholic bishops in the Caribbean
21st-century Roman Catholic bishops in the Caribbean
Jamaican Roman Catholic archbishops
1934 births
Living people
Members of the Order of Jamaica
Roman Catholic archbishops of Kingston in Jamaica
Roman Catholic bishops of Saint John's–Basseterre